The Welter Racing WR LMP2008 is an LMP sports prototype race car, designed, developed and built by French racing team Welter Racing, for sports car racing, in 2008. It is powered by a Zytek ZG348 engine which develops a power of approximately  @ 9,500 rpm, for a torque of  @ 8,000 rpm. In 2008, it competed in both the European 2008 Le Mans Series as well as the 2008 24 Hours of Le Mans.

References

Sports prototypes
Le Mans Prototypes
24 Hours of Le Mans race cars